Frank Gebert (born 6 November 1952) is a former professional tennis player from Germany.

Biography
Gebert lost to Byron Bertram in the boys' singles final at the 1970 Wimbledon Championships.

During the 1970s, he competed professionally and he appeared in all four Grand Slam tournaments. He made the third round of the 1976 French Open.

His best year on tour was 1977, when he was a finalist at the Cairo Open. He lost the final to François Jauffret, who he then beat along with Pat DuPré en route to the semi-finals of his next Grand Prix tournament in Murcia. Later in the year, he made further semi-finals in Gstaad and Zürich. He also managed to win the first set against Guillermo Vilas when they met in the Louisville Open.

A graduate of the Free University of Berlin, Gebert is now a professor of economics at SRH University Heidelberg.

Grand Prix career finals

Singles: 1 (0–1)

References

External links
 
 

1952 births
Living people
West German male tennis players
Academic staff of SRH University Heidelberg
Free University of Berlin alumni